Michael Akuffu  (born 18 December 1987) is a Ghanaian professional footballer, who currently plays as a defensive midfielder or right-back for Mekelle Kenema.

Club career 
Akuffu began his club career with Ghana Football Leagues club Feyenoord Ghana. Akuffu is a defensive midfielder and right-back who enjoyed regular berth on loan to ASEC Mimosas. After 1 year at ASEC Mimosas Akuffu rejoined Feyenoord Ghana, and in July 2009 Akuffu went on trial in Finnish club FC PoPa. After the trial Akuffu signed a loan agreement until the end of the Finnish season. In the first 2 matches of FC PoPa Akuffu he already made a good impression by scoring 2 goals in 2 matches. In December 2010, Akuffu joined Asante Kotoko.

International career
In November 2013, coach Maxwell Konadu invited Akuffu to be included in the Ghana 30-man team for the 2013 WAFU Nations Cup that Akuffu helped Ghana defeat Senegal for a first-place finish, 3-1. Akuffu was included in the Ghana national football team for the 2014 African Nations Championship that finished runner-up.

Honours

Club 
Asante Kotoko
 Ghana Premier League Winner: 2011–12, 2012–13, 2013–14
 Ghanaian FA Cup: Runner-up 2012–13, Winner 2013–14
 Ghana Super Cup Winner: 2012–13

National Team 

 WAFU Nations Cup Winner: 2013
 African Nations Championship Runner-up: 2014

References 

Living people
Footballers from Kumasi
Ghanaian footballers
Association football midfielders
Association football fullbacks
Expatriate footballers in Ivory Coast
Expatriate footballers in Finland
ASEC Mimosas players
West African Football Academy players
Asante Kotoko S.C. players
Ghana Premier League players
WAFU Nations Cup players
Ghana A' international footballers
2014 African Nations Championship players
Ghana international footballers
Mekelle 70 Enderta F.C. players
Ethiopian Premier League players
Ghanaian expatriate sportspeople in Ivory Coast
Ghanaian expatriate sportspeople in Ethiopia
Ghanaian expatriate sportspeople in Finland
1987 births